Nowshad may refer to:
 Nowshad, Khuzestan
 Nowshad, Kurdistan

See also
 Nowshadi, a village in Khuzestan Province, Iran